Petersburg, Iowa may refer to:
Petersburg, Delaware County, Iowa
Petersburg, Muscatine County, Iowa